The 1955 VFL Grand Final was an Australian rules football game contested between the Melbourne Football Club and Collingwood Football Club, held at the Melbourne Cricket Ground on 17 September 1955. It was the 58th annual Grand Final of the Victorian Football League, staged to determine the premiers for the 1955 VFL season. The match, attended by 88,053 spectators, was won by Melbourne by 28 points, marking that club's seventh premiership victory.

A scene from the game is captured in Jamie Cooper's painting The Game That Made Australia, commissioned by the AFL in 2008 to celebrate the 150th anniversary of the sport.

Teams

{|
|valign="top"|

Umpire: Harry Beitzel

Statistics

Goalkickers

References

AFL Tables: 1955 Grand Final
 The Official statistical history of the AFL 2004 
 Ross, J. (ed), 100 Years of Australian Football 1897-1996: The Complete Story of the AFL, All the Big Stories, All the Great Pictures, All the Champions, Every AFL Season Reported, Viking, (Ringwood), 1996. 

VFL/AFL Grand Finals
Vfl Grand Final, 1955
Melbourne Football Club
Collingwood Football Club
September 1955 sports events in Australia